James Marion Hewgley Jr. (November 8, 1916 in Gallatin, Tennessee – May 17, 2011) was the Mayor of Tulsa, Oklahoma from 1966 to 1970. He was named to the Oklahoma Hall of Fame in 1984 and the Tulsa Hall of Fame in 1993.

References

External links
City of Tulsa - Gallery of Mayors

Voices of Oklahoma interview. First person interview conducted on May 18, 2009, with Jim Hewgley, Jr.

1916 births
2011 deaths
People from Gallatin, Tennessee
Mayors of Tulsa, Oklahoma